The Belarusian Home Defence, or Belarusian Home Guard (BKA) were collaborationist volunteer battalions formed by the Byelorussian Central Council (1943–1944), a pro-Nazi Belarusian  self-government within Reichskommissariat Ostland during World War II.
The BKA operated from February 23, 1944 to April 28, 1945. The 20,000 strong Belarusian Home Defence Force was formed under the leadership of Commissioner-General Curt von Gottberg, with logistical help from the German 36th Waffen Grenadier Division of the SS known as the "Poachers' Brigade" commanded by Oskar Dirlewanger.

Creation
After the Wehrmacht suffered two major strategic defeats at Stalingrad (in February 1943) and at Kursk (in August 1943) the Germans made some concessions to the Byelorussian collaborators by proposing a Byelorussian quasi-state. Assistance was offered by the local administrative governments from the Soviet era, and former members of public organizations including the Soviet Belarusian Youth.

On March 6, 1944 the general mobilization of all healthy men born between 1908 and 1924 into the BKA started. Some 40,000 individuals reported to recruitment bureaus set up in seven cities; although 30% of them were sent back home on German orders for overcrowding. From each region (Uezd) about 500 to 600 men were recruited, for the total of 28,000 soldiers ready for training.

On March 26, all men already enlisted to the BKA gave their oath at Freedom Square in Minsk: "I swear, that arm to arm with the German soldier, I will not lay down my weapons until there is peace and security in our farms and cities, until in our land the last enemy of the Byelorussian people is destroyed."The oath was accepted by the BKA commander Ivan Yermachenka, in the presence of the SS and Police Leader Curt von Gottberg. The president of the Byelorussian Central Council, Radasłaŭ Astroŭski, had concerns that some Soviet partisans might have infiltrated the new BKA structures and that therefore it would need a thorough inspection afterwards.

On March 31, 1944, the BKA battalions received their individual designations. In total, there were 45 battalions formed, mostly infantry. However, to prevent possible staged desertions to "forest people" weapons were handed out only during training exercises with nothing to spare. The German SS didn't have enough officers to train all of them, therefore a few thousand members of the Byelorussian Auxiliary Police, not older than 57 years and Unteroffiziers not older than 55 years of age (except those protecting the collaborationist government), were brought into the fold of BKA. Organization was controlled by the German Police and SD commandants.

In mid-June 1944 an officer school for BKA volunteers was started by the German SS in Minsk, but the city was overrun by the Soviets only two weeks later. After evacuating the Council to Königsberg and soon to Berlin in November 1944 along with upper echelon, the 1st personnel battalion was formed. Meanwhile, battalions of BKA on Byelorussian territory, were mainly used in anti-partisan operations and later at the front against the Red Army.

Dissolving

The BKA ceased to exist after Red Army regained control in the Byelorussian SSR. Some BKA units retreated to the West and became the base for the creation of the Schutzmannschaft-Brigade Siegling. Many conscripts quietly went back home to their Byelorussian villages.

The BCR existed till late 1980s in the United States and president Radasłaŭ Astroŭski worked till 1960. Most of its members, as members of other organizations, received political asylum as immigrants. In April and May 1945, most of the BKA and SBM submitted to Russian Liberation Army surrendered to the western Allies. Later propagandists hold that the Byelorussian Liberation Armies 1st personnel battalion in Berlin in fact was a reserve for the 30th Waffen Grenadier Division of the SS (2nd Russian). Eleven its officers, including B. D. Rahula and others entered the 1st Grenadier Sturm Brigade SS "Byelorussia", formed in Nazi Germany; it was sent to the Battle of Monte Cassino, and acted against the II Corps (Poland) of General Władysław Anders (Anders Army). BKA soldiers were not trusted by the Germans, which explains why Russian Liberation Army formations weren't sent to the Eastern Front, and combat at Western Front.

Rank insignia

See also
Waffen-SS foreign volunteers and conscripts
Wehrmacht foreign volunteers and conscripts
Schutzmannschaft
German occupation of Byelorussia during World War II
Byelorussian collaboration with Nazi Germany
The Holocaust in Belarus
Byelorussia in World War II

Notes

References
 
 
 Biełaruskaja Krajovaja Abarona. Uniforms and Insignia.
 
 

 
Military history of Belarus during World War II
Generalbezirk Weißruthenien
Military history of Germany during World War II
Military units and formations established in 1944
Belarusian collaboration with Nazi Germany